Derek Foster, Baron Foster of Bishop Auckland,  (25 June 1937 – 5 January 2019) was a British Labour Party politician who served as Member of Parliament for Bishop Auckland, in County Durham, from 1979 to 2005.

Political career
Foster was first elected to represent Bishop Auckland at the 1979 general election, and held this seat until his retirement in 2005. He served as opposition Chief Whip between 1985 and 1995, becoming a member of the Privy Council in 1993. After Tony Blair became leader in 1994, he was keen to appoint a new Chief Whip and asked Foster to stand aside, in return for the promise of a seat in the Cabinet if and when Labour returned to power. Foster eventually agreed and became Shadow Chancellor of the Duchy of Lancaster in 1995.

However, when Labour won the 1997 election, Foster was appointed to the relatively junior role of Parliamentary Secretary in the Cabinet Office, under David Clark. After giving the matter further thought, Foster stood down from the government after just two days, and later publicly accused Mr Blair of having broken his promise to him.  He was eventually appointed chair of the Commons sub-committee on employment, becoming something of a thorn in the Government's side during Mr Blair's first term. However, the employment sub-committee was abolished in 2001 and he became a backbencher, retiring from the Commons at the 2005 general election.

He was appointed as a deputy lieutenant of County Durham in 2001, giving him the post-nominal letters "DL" for life. On 13 May 2005 it was announced that he would be created a life peer, and in June 2005 the peerage was gazetted as Baron Foster of Bishop Auckland, of Bishop Auckland in the County of Durham. He died from cancer at a hospital in Sunderland on 5 January 2019, at the age of 81.

Other interests
Foster was deeply committed to  The Salvation Army, serving at the Sunderland Millfield Corps, whilst also a member of the Labour Friends of Israel Policy Council.

Arms

References

External links
 

|-

|-

|-

|-

1937 births
2019 deaths
Deputy Lieutenants of Durham
English Salvationists
Labour Party (UK) MPs for English constituencies
Foster of Bishop Auckland
Labour Friends of Israel
Members of the Privy Council of the United Kingdom
People educated at Bede Grammar School for Boys
UK MPs 1979–1983
UK MPs 1983–1987
UK MPs 1987–1992
UK MPs 1992–1997
UK MPs 1997–2001
UK MPs 2001–2005
20th-century Methodists
Deaths from cancer in England
Life peers created by Elizabeth II